The Wat Ananda Youth is a Buddhist youth organisation for adolescents and young members interested in Buddhism based in Singapore. The President of the group as of 2014 is Phanom Sinth Suwanarat. Other patrons include Tee Koon Tiong and Kweh Soon Han.

Overview

Wat Ananda Youth was formerly known as the Ananda Metyarama Buddhist Youth Circle (AMBYC). It was born on 23 November 1966 and was the first Buddhist Youth Circle in Singapore. Maha Somkuan Aggadhamma (Phraku Bisaldhammanides) became the first Spiritual Advisor. On 28 November 1966, His Excellency, Mr Payong Chutikul the Royal Thai Ambassador officially declared the opening of AMBYC.

WAY seeks to propagate the dhamma through spiritual friendship and practice-focused interest groups:
 To study, practise and propagate the Dhamma.
 To train the youth for, and encourage them in acts of, charity and general helpfulness to their fellow beings.
 To educate the youth to become better members towards society.
 To foster co-operation among Buddhist Youth and fellow beings.
 To lead a decent and moral social life.
 To participate in healthy recreations.

Structure
The Wat Ananda Youth comes with the following appointments:

References

External links
 Wat Ananda Metyarama

Buddhist youth organizations
Youth organisations based in Singapore
Religious organizations established in 1966